Dicyemida, also known as Rhombozoa, is a phylum of tiny parasites that live in the renal appendages of cephalopods.

Taxonomy 

Classification is controversial. Traditionally, dicyemids have been grouped with the Orthonectida in the Mesozoa, and, as of 2017, molecular evidence appears to confirm this.

However, other molecular phylogenies have placed the dicyemids more closely related to the roundworms. Additional molecular evidence suggests that this phylum is derived from the Lophotrochozoa.

The phylum is not divided in classes or orders, but contains three families, Conocyemidae, Dicyemidae, and Kantharellidae.

Anatomy
They display eutely, a condition in which each adult individual of a given species has the same number of cells, making cell number a useful identifying character. Dicyemida lack respiratory, circulatory, excretory, digestive, and nervous systems.

The organism's structure is simple: a single axial cell is surrounded by a jacket of twenty to thirty ciliated cells. The anterior region of the organism is termed a calotte and functions to attach the parasite to folds on the surface of its host's renal appendages.

Life cycle
Dicyemids exist in both asexual and sexual forms. The former predominate in juvenile and immature hosts, and the latter in mature hosts. The asexual stage is termed a nematogen; it produces vermiform larvae within the axial cell. These mature through direct development to form more nematogens. Nematogens proliferate in young cephalopods, filling the kidneys.

As the infection ages, perhaps as the nematogens reach a certain density, vermiform larvae mature to form rhombogens, the sexual life stage, rather than more nematogens. This sort of density-responsive reproductive cycle is reminiscent of the asexual reproduction of sporocysts or rediae in larval trematode infections of snails. As with the trematode asexual stages, a few nematogens can usually be found in older hosts. Their function may be to increase the population of the parasite to keep up with the growth of the host.

Rhombogens contain hermaphroditic gonads developed within the axial cell. These gonads, more correctly termed infusorigens, self-fertilise to produce infusoriform'' larvae. These larvae possess a very distinctive morphology, swimming about with ciliated rings that resemble headlights. It has long been assumed that this sexually produced infusoriform, which is released when the host eliminates urine from the kidneys, is both the dispersal and the infectious stage. The mechanism of infection, however, remains unknown, as are the effects, if any, of dicyemids on their hosts.

Some part of the dicyemid life cycle may be tied to temperate benthic environments, where they occur in greatest abundance. While dicyemids have occasionally been found in the tropics, the infection rates are typically quite low, and many potential host species are not infected. Dicyemids have never been reported from truly oceanic cephalopods, who instead host a parasitic ciliate fauna. Most dicyemid species are recovered from only one or two host species. While not strictly host specific, most dicyemids are only found in a few closely related hosts.

References

Further reading

  
 
 
 
 

 
Animal phyla
Parasitic protostomes
Parasites of molluscs